Chernyshevsky is an urban locality (an urban-type settlement) in Mirninsky District of the Sakha Republic, Russia, located  from Mirny, the administrative center of the district, on the southern edge of the Central Siberian Plateau on the Vilyuy River, a tributary of the Lena. As of the 2010 Census, its population was 5,025.

History
It was founded in 1959 with the construction of the dam and hydroelectric plant on the Vilyuy River and granted urban-type settlement status in 1961. It was named after Nikolay Chernyshevsky, who was exiled in Siberia from 1864 until 1883, including from 1871 in nearby Vilyuysk.

After the hydroelectric project was completed in 1976, a large number of inhabitants moved away, with the population falling by almost a third between 1970 and 1979 but remaining fairly stable in the following years.

Administrative and municipal status
Within the framework of administrative divisions, the urban-type settlement of Chernyshevsky is incorporated within Mirninsky District as the Settlement of Chernyshevsky. As a municipal division, the Settlement of Chernyshevsky is incorporated within Mirninsky Municipal District as Chernyshevsky Urban Settlement.

Economy and infrastructure
Chernyshevsky is the site of the Vilyuy Dam, the first major hydroelectric project in the world to be built on permafrost, and with the coldest operating conditions of any hydroelectric plant in the world. The dam and the associated hydroelectric plant (Vilyuyskaya GES) are the main employers. The plant has a capacity of 680 MW and supplies power for the diamond mining activities in the nearby Udachny and Mirny.

There is also some fish farming in the reservoir behind the Vilyuy Dam, as well as some timber production and a geological research organization.

Transportation
Chernyshevsky lies on the road leading from Lensk on the Lena River to Mirny and Udachny. This is currently being upgraded as the future Anabar Highway, which will connect up to the Anabar River and the Arctic Ocean.

Climate
Chernyshevsky has a harsh subarctic climate (Dfc).

References

Notes

Sources
Official website of the Sakha Republic. Registry of the Administrative-Territorial Divisions of the Sakha Republic. Mirninsky District.

External links
Unofficial website of Chernyshevsky 

Urban-type settlements in the Sakha Republic